Papyrus 110, designated by  (in the Gregory-Aland numbering of New Testament manuscripts) is a copy of the New Testament in Greek. It is a papyrus manuscripts of the Gospel of Matthew, containing verses 10:13-15 & 10:25-27 in a fragmentary condition. Using the study of comparative writings styles (palaeography), the manuscript has been dated by the INTF to the early 4th century CE. Papyrologist Philip Comfort dates the manuscript to Middle-Late 3rd century CE. 
The manuscript is currently housed in the Papyrology Rooms of the Sackler Library at Oxford University, with the shelf number P. Oxy. 4494.

Description 

The original manuscript would've been around 12 cm x 22 cm, with 40–43 lines per page. The handwriting script is representative of the Reformed Documentary or Professional (bookhand) style.
The Greek text of this fragment (and its parent codex) is considered to be representative of the Alexandrian text-type.

Unique readings
 has several unique readings:

Matthew 10:14
 εξερχομενων υμων (as you are leaving) :  
 εξερχομενοι : Majority of manuscripts

 πολεως η κωμης (city or village) :   892 ƒ
 πολεως : Majority of manuscripts
 εκεινης (that) 
 omit :  D lat
 incl. : Majority of manuscripts
 απο (from) : 
 ἐκ :  C 33 892
 omit : B Majority of manuscripts
 εκμαξατε (wipe) : 
 εκτιναξατε (shake) : Majority of manuscripts

Matthew 10:25 (1)
 επεκαλεσαν βεελζεβουλ : 
 βεελζεβουλ επεκαλεσαν :  C W ƒ 33 Majority of manuscripts it sy co Cyp

10:25 (a)
 βεελσεβουλ : *
 βεελζεβουλ :  Θ 0171 ƒ 700 1424 L N pm
βεεζεβουλ :  B pc

10:25 (b)
 επεκαλεσεν : *
 επεκαλεσαν :   B C W ƒ 33  it sy co Cyp
 επεκαλεσαντο : * L N pc
 εκαλεσαν : Θ 0171 ƒ 700 1424 pm
 καλουσιν : D

10:25 (2)
 τοις : * B
 τους :  D C W ƒ  it sy co

10:25 (3)
 οικιοις : *
 οικιους : 
 οικιακοις : B
 οικειακους : D
 οικιακους :  C W ƒ  it sy co

See also 

 List of New Testament papyri
 Matthew 10
 Oxyrhynchus Papyri

References

Further reading 

 Cockle, Walter E. H. The Oxyrhynchus Papyri. Volume 45. London: Egypt Exploration Society, 1999. Pages 1–3.

External links

Images 
 P.Oxy.LXIV 4494 from Papyrology at Oxford's "POxy: Oxyrhynchus Online" 
 𝔓110 recto: Matt 10:13-15
 𝔓110 verso: Matt 10:25-27

Official registration 
 "Continuation of the Manuscript List" Institute for New Testament Textual Research, University of Münster. Retrieved April 9, 2008

Transcription and Translation 
 𝔓110 Transcription and English Literal Translation

New Testament papyri
4th-century biblical manuscripts
Gospel of Matthew papyri